The Namibian Tri-Nations tournament (or Windhoek Lager Tri-Nations Rugby Series for sponsorship reasons) was designed to bring more international rugby union test matches to the lower tiered teams in the Confederation of African Rugby region. Originally, the hosts Namibia were invited to Europe by the International Rugby Board to play part in the 2012 International Rugby Series. However, Namibia turned the offer down to create their own tournament so they could bring more international rugby to the Namibian fans at home.

The tournament consisted of two further developing rugby nations: Europe's Spain and fellow African nation Zimbabwe. The tournament was played between November 10 and November 17, but was only played on three dedicated days at Namibia's national stadium, Hage Geingob Rugby Stadium in Windhoek. The tournament opened with the hosts playing Zimbabwe and ended again with the hosts, this time playing against Spain.

With the end result between Namibia and Spain, the European side won the tournament with two wins out of two.

Table

Matches

Namibia v Zimbabwe

Zimbabwe v Spain

Namibia v Spain

See also
 2012 end-of-year rugby union tests
 2012 mid-year rugby union tests
 2012 International Rugby Series

References

2012 in African rugby union
2012 rugby union tournaments for national teams
rugby union
rugby union
2012–13 in Spanish rugby union
rugby union